Taedong Gate is the eastern gate of the inner castle of the walled city of Pyongyang (Pyongyang Castle), and one of the National Treasures of North Korea.  Located on the banks of the Taedong River, from which it gets its name, the gate was originally built in the sixth century as an official Koguryo construction, and, along with the Ryongwang Pavilion and Pyongyang Bell, served as the center of the inner castle's eastern defenses. The present construction dates from 1635, however, as the original was burnt to the ground during the Imjin wars of the late 16th century.

The current gate features a granite base topped by a two-story pavilion, called the Euphoru Pavilion (읍호루), because of its grand views of the Taedong River.

It is National Treasure #4 in North Korea.

See also
National Treasures of North Korea
Potongmun

References

External links

vnctravel.nl
kcna.co.jp

Buildings and structures in Pyongyang
National Treasures of North Korea
Goguryeo
Gates in North Korea
Gates in Korea